Marie Magdeleine Real del Sarte or Real del Sarte (1853 – 1927) was a French painter and model.

Real del Sarte was born in Paris as the daughter of François Delsarte, and attended the Académie Julian from 1874 where she was taught by Gustave Boulanger, Tony Robert-Fleury and Jules Lefebvre. She is the blond girl in the middle of Marie Bashkirtseff's 1881 painting In the Studio. She became a teacher there while still attending classes and married her cousin, the sculptor Louis Désiré Réal on 1 March 1887. After that she began signing her works Real del Sarte. Her son Maxime Real del Sarte became a sculptor. Her painting Do You Want to Model? was one of the works featured in Women Painters of the World by Walter Shaw Sparrow (1905); one of the first books that treated 19th-century female artists as worthy of serious attention. Her niece Thérèse Geraldy was her pupil.

Sarte died in Paris.

External links
Magdeleine Delsarte at geneanet.org
Album at Picasaweb

References

Cat. nr. 1395 at the Paris Salon 1906
work discussed at the Paris Salon 1892

1853 births
1927 deaths
Painters from Paris
French women painters
French artists' models
19th-century French painters
19th-century French women artists
20th-century French painters
20th-century French women artists
Académie Julian alumni